Herbert Zimmermann may refer to:

 Herbert Zimmermann (football commentator) (1917–1966), German football commentator and Knight's Cross of the Iron Cross recipient
 Herbert Zimmermann (neuroscientist) (born 1944), German neuroscientist
 Herbert Zimmermann (footballer) (born 1954), German football player